Thomas Howard, 8th Duke of Norfolk, Earl Marshal (11 December 1683 – 23 December 1732) was an English peer and politician. He was the first son of Lord Thomas Howard and Mary Elizabeth Savile. Upon the death of his uncle Henry Howard, 7th Duke of Norfolk, he inherited the titles of 17th Baron Furnivall and 8th Duke of Norfolk. He married Maria Shireburn, daughter of Sir Nicholas Shireburn, 1st and last Bt., of Stonyhurst Hall, on 26 May 1709, when she was age 16 and a half, with a fortune of more than £30,000.

At the time of the Jacobite Rising of 1715, he used his influence to secure the acquittal of his brother Edward on the charge of high treason. The Duke himself was arrested on 29 October 1722  under suspicion of involvement in a Jacobite plot, and was imprisoned in the Tower of London. His wife, refused permission to visit, prevailed upon the Earl of Carlisle to act as surety for his bail in May 1723.  Howard was Grand Master of the Grand Lodge of England from 1729–30.

His marriage is said to have been unhappy, and his wife, a staunch Catholic and Jacobite, separated from him when he—in her words—"truckled to the Usurper".

The Duke died childless on 23 December 1732 at age 49. Upon his death, the title passed to his brother Edward.

References

Family tree 

1683 births
1732 deaths
17th-century English nobility
18th-century English nobility
Earls Marshal
Thomas Howard, 08th Duke of Norfolk
308
26
306
6th Earl of Norfolk
Earls of Norwich
Barons Mowbray
16
23
Prisoners in the Tower of London
Grand Masters of the Premier Grand Lodge of England
Freemasons of the Premier Grand Lodge of England
Barons Talbot
Barons Strange of Blackmere